WAQF Tower is a skyscraper in Niamey, Niger, and is the country's tallest building, standing at 58.85 meters. Construction finished in 2019. The foundation was ceremonially laid by Niger's president Mahamadou Issoufou.

References 

Skyscrapers in Niger